Flipnote Studio, originally released in Japan as , was a free downloadable application available through the Nintendo DSi's DSiWare digital distribution service. Developed by Nintendo EAD Tokyo, Flipnote Studio allowed the user to create both word-based and picture-based notes with the stylus, add sound, and combine them to create frame-by-frame flipbook-style animations. In English-language keynote addresses and conferences prior to its release, the application was referred to as Moving Notepad by Nintendo, and was announced at E3 2009 officially as Flipnote Studio. It was released in Japan on December 24, 2008, in North America on August 12, 2009, and in Europe and Australia on August 14, 2009. It was later included as a preloaded program on the Nintendo DSi and DSi XL with firmware 1.4.

An online service, titled  allowed users to download flipnotes created by other users and to post stills from flipnotes to the sharing site Miiverse. The service officially retired on May 31, 2013. However, users were still able to transfer Flipnotes from their Flipnote Hatena account to the Flipnote Gallery World service provided with Flipnote Studio 3D, until it was shut down on April 2, 2018.

After the closure of the Nintendo DSi Shop on March 31, 2017, the original Flipnote Studio is no longer available for download. The original Flipnote application cannot be transferred onto the Nintendo 3DS; instead, a successor titled Flipnote Studio 3D was released for the platform.

Development

Flipnote Studio was developed by Yoshiaki Koizumi and Hideaki Shimizu. The two began working on the project without the knowledge of anyone else at Nintendo EAD Tokyo. It was initially designed as a tool for taking notes with the name Moving Notepad, and it was considered early on as a possible WiiWare application to transmit these notes from a DS to the Wii to be shared with other users of the application. When the Nintendo DSi was announced, it was decided by Nintendo president Satoru Iwata that the company would work with Hatena, as the latter had recently shifted its R&D department to Kyoto, where Nintendo Corporate Labs is located.

It was released in Japan on December 24, 2008, in North America on August 12, 2009, and in Europe and Australia on August 14, 2009.

Features
 Flipnote Studio offers the user three main tools with which to create drawings: a pen, an eraser, and a paintbrush, each of which are heavily customizable. With these tools, the user may create frames for animated sketches (called Flipnotes), which can hold up to 999 frames each. Animation speed ranges from 0.5 - 30 FPS, and is able to be changed freely by the user. Additional features such as layering, shrinking, enlarging, moving, copying, cutting, pasting, etc. are also available, as well as the option to import images via the DSi Camera Album. The Japanese version of the software allows the user to take photos directly from Flipnote Studio itself. In addition, the user may choose to record up to 4 different sound banks (each holding up to 2 seconds of sound) with the DSi microphone or import sounds from DSi Sound, then save them as a 'mastered' soundtrack (which can hold up to 1 minute of sound).

The application is set to right-hand mode by default. When drawing, the left and right buttons on the D-pad cycle through the frames of the animation being drawn. Pressing the down button will play the animation, and pressing the up button will take the user to the tools section, where the current drawing tool can be changed. The L button triggers advanced tool options, such as changing the size of the drawing. If the user uses left-hand mode, the buttons will switch places.

Flipnote Hatena

Overview
Shortly before the release of Moving Notepad in Japan, Nintendo announced that they were partnering with Japanese web services provider Hatena to provide the means to share works created with the software. Speaking for Nintendo, Yoshiaki Koizumi stated they chose to work with Hatena because "it takes a special skill set to maintain the User Generated Contents (UGC) site, and we don't have that skill. We rely on Hatena on that part."

"Flipnote Hatena" refers to both the portion of the Flipnote Studio application that connects to the Flipnote Hatena website as well as the website itself (the Japanese version of the program differentiates between the two, but not the English version). Through the DSi portion of the application, users were able to download Flipnotes to their DSi, upload their own Flipnotes, and add stars to Flipnotes uploaded by others. Users could also 'spin off' another user's Flipnote, by downloading it and editing it.

The Flipnote Hatena website offered the ability for users to rate and comment on the works of others, as well as to embed their animations into other webpages. Users could also flag submissions as inappropriate; Flipnotes that were flagged were not viewable via the DSi's Flipnote Hatena and could have been removed from the website altogether.

When uploaded, Flipnote animations were placed into specific categories by their creators. These categories, known as "channels," included general classifications such as "Musical" and "Comedy," as well as more specific categories suggested by popular Flipnote users and accepted by Hatena. For example, the categories "Stick Figures," "Spoof," and "Birds" were added at the request of users.

Stars
Flipnote Hatena had its own economy of "stars." Stars were used to rate Flipnotes (similarly to YouTube's "like" function), and users could add as many stars as they desired to any Flipnote. In addition to the regular Stars, users could purchase or earn Color Stars. In increasing rarity, these colors were green, red, blue, and purple. Users could earn Green Stars by reporting inappropriate Flipnotes, using other Hatena services, posting Flipnotes frequently (based on the number of days they posted Flipnotes), or managing a popular Channel. Red Stars were given to creators whose Flipnotes were featured in the Weekly News. In addition, users could purchase "boxes" containing a certain number of Color Stars. The contents of these boxes were randomized, so users wouldn't know how many stars of each color they would receive; but the larger the purchased box was, the more likely the user was to receive rare Color Stars.

The Star system on Flipnote Hatena had a mixed reception from users. The ability to add infinite stars was a major drawback, as a large part of the Flipnote Hatena community became focused on receiving as many stars as possible. This led to a practice referred to among the community as "star begging", where Flipnotes, often direct copies of others, were created for the sole purpose of gaining stars.

End of the service
Prior to the release of Moving Notepad/Flipnote Studio 3D, the closure of the Flipnote Hatena communities was announced. The service was officially shut down on May 31, 2013. Fans vocally protested the shutdown and contacted Nintendo, Hatena, and even news media in an attempt to prevent the end of the services. Several fans even created websites and servers to continue sharing Flipnotes after the shutdown.

Nintendo announced that the Flipnotes on Flipnote Hatena would be transferred to the new online service for Moving Notepad/Flipnote Studio 3D. The DSi Flipnotes were accessible from the Nintendo DSi Gallery, a free-to-access section of the Flipnote Gallery: World. The main purpose of the DSi Gallery was for users to transfer their Flipnotes from Flipnote Studio to Flipnote Studio 3D, where they could be edited like any other Flipnote. Flipnote Gallery: World was never released outside of Japan. Instead, other regions were given a service called the Nintendo DSi Library, where users could download their Flipnotes from Flipnote Hatena. DSi Library was critically panned for lacks of various features, randomly selection and distortion audio. Services for Flipnote Gallery: World and Nintendo DSi Library were both ended on April 1, 2018.

Since the closure of the official servers, numerous groups have come forward to create unofficial servers to reimplement the application's online functionalities. The most notable of such custom servers is Sudomemo, which launched in 2014.

On May 31, 2022, an archive called Flipnote Archive was released by Sudomemo, containing over 44,351,673 Flipnotes that had been posted to Flipnote Hatena prior to its deactivation on May 31, 2013. The archive contains 12 TB of Flipnotes.

Sharing Flipnotes
Aside from the Flipnote Hatena website, Flipnotes may be shared between two users via the DSi's Wireless Communication feature. When a Flipnote has been shared in this manner, the users may choose to save their contact information as friends on the Nintendo DSi and on the Flipnote Hatena website. Flipnotes may also be saved to an SD card (to be inserted into another DSi). When a person receives a Flipnote from a creator the first time, they become friends with each other.

Other uses

Official contests
In 2010 and 2011, as part of the 25th Anniversary celebrations for the Mario and Zelda series, Nintendo sponsored official Flipnote contests. For both contests, users were invited to create a Flipnote based on the series using template Flipnotes (with music and sound effects) posted on Flipnote Hatena. Entries were judged and selected by some of the head developers of the series, including Eiji Aonuma for the Zelda Flipnotes, and Shigeru Miyamoto for the Mario Flipnotes. Winning Flipnotes were made available to view on YouTube and Nintendo's official website, the Nintendo Channel, and the 3DS eShop (Zelda winners only).

Music videos

Flipnote Studio has been used by musicians to create animated music videos for their songs.

One such artist is Billy Polard, who used looping .gif files created in and exported from Flipnote Studio to create videos. The first video he released using this method was made for the song "Losing Light", which was followed by a second music video titled "When Our Bedrooms Were Once Haunted".

Artist Arman Bohn took a different approach. For his music video for Brain Games, he created hundreds of elements, including anthropomorphic numbers and letters, in Flipnote Studio and exported them as .gifs. He then used computer software to assemble these elements into his music video. The random arrangement of objects was intended to serve as a contrast to the lyrics of the song, which is about the scientific method. In his blog, Arman Bohn described his effort to keep the "jaggy" quality of the Flipnote art.

A music video created partly in Flipnote Studio and animated by Kékéflipnote was used for "The Living Tombstone's remix of Epoch" by Savlonic.

Reception

As of January 10, 2009, there had been more than 100,000 user-submitted creations. During its first six months of operation in Japan, Flipnote Hatena reports having received over 1,000,000 user-submitted creations.   
 
IGN gave the Flipnote Studio an "outstanding" rating of 9.0/10, while also giving it an editors' choice award.

Official Nintendo Magazine awarded it 95%.

See also

Miiverse
Swapnote

References

External links

Flipnote Studio at Nintendo.co.jp 
Flipnote Hatena website
Flipnote Studio website

2008 video games
2D animation software
DSiWare games
Nintendo DS-only games
Nintendo DS games
Nintendo games
Nintendo Wi-Fi Connection games
Multiplayer and single-player video games
Video games developed in Japan
Flipnote Hatena